State Highway 71 (CO 71 or SH 71) is a  state highway passing several other highways in northern and central Colorado. SH 71's southern terminus is at U.S. Route 350 (US 350) near La Junta, and the northern terminus is a continuation as Nebraska Highway 71 (N-71) at the Nebraska border, which eventually crosses into South Dakota as South Dakota Highway 71 (SD-71), making Highway 71 a triple-state highway.

State Highway 71 is the subject of a truck freight diversion feasibility study being conducted by the Colorado Department of Transportation to explore diverting truck traffic from Interstate 25.

Route description

SH 71 begins at its southern terminus with U.S. Route 350 in La Junta, Colorado. It proceeds north into Crowley County and the city of Ordway, where it is signed as Phantom Avenue. The highway continues northward to a junction with Interstate 70 (I-70) adjacent to US 24.

In La Junta, the highway continues north for several miles to Ordway, then it takes a northeast turn to Limon. It then goes back north and skirts the town of Brush. It then heads through rural country to Nebraska.

In Stoneham, the state portion of the road overlaps County Road 142 and heads to the north. The route takes a northeast turn and continues in to Nebraska as N-71.

Major intersections

References

External links

 Colorado Routes 60-79 The Highways of Colorado

071
Transportation in Otero County, Colorado
Transportation in Crowley County, Colorado
Transportation in Lincoln County, Colorado
Transportation in Washington County, Colorado
Transportation in Morgan County, Colorado
Transportation in Weld County, Colorado